Leon Dash (born , in New Bedford, Massachusetts) is a professor of journalism at the University of Illinois at Urbana-Champaign. A former reporter for the Washington Post, he is the author of Rosa Lee: A Mother and Her Family in Urban America, which grew out of the eight-part Washington Post series for which he won the Pulitzer Prize.

Biography 
Dash grew up in New York City and later attended Howard University. He spent 1969-1970 as a Peace Corps high school teacher in Kenya. He joined the Washington Post in 1965 where he worked as a member of the special projects unit, as part of the investigative desk, and as the West Africa Bureau Chief.
 
Rosa Lee, which started as an eight-part series for the Washington Post in September 1994, is the story of one woman and her family's struggle against poverty in the projects of Washington, D.C.

Aside from winning a Pulitzer Prize for Explanatory Journalism for the story, the Rosa Lee piece was also the recipient of the Robert F. Kennedy Journalism Award and was later published into a book. It was picked as one of the best 100 pieces in 20th-century American Journalism by New York University's journalism department.

While living in the inner city of Washington, D.C., for a year, Dash researched teenage pregnancy in black youths for his book, When Children Want Children: The Urban Crisis of Teenage Childbearing. The book features conversations with teens and contains stories that contradict the common belief that inadequate birth control and lack of sex education classes are the causes of teenage pregnancy.

He received an Emmy Award in 1996 from the National Academy of Television Arts and Sciences for a documentary series in the public affairs category of hard issues.

In 1998 Dash joined the University of Illinois as a professor of Journalism. He was later named the Swanlund Chair Professor of Journalism, Law, and Afro-American Studies in 2000. Three years later he was made a permanent faculty member in the University's Center for Advanced Study.

Dash is a founder of the National Association of Black Journalists.

A technical oversight on Dash's part led to his being sanctioned by the Illinois Executive Ethics Commission on October 31, 2014.   A University of Illinois faculty colleague, physicist George D. Gollin, was running in the March 14, 2014 Democratic primary nomination for Illinois's U. S. Congressional District 13 Seat. Gollin sent a message to Dash on his University office computer about Dash introducing him at a local meeting.  Dash replied on his University computer, "Please get the introduction to me tomorrow or early Sunday. Thanks." Dash was later questioned about his one-sentence reply by investigators from the Illinois Executive Ethics Commission regarding the use of his University computer for political purposes. Shown a copy of his one-sentence reply, Dash acknowledged he had replied to the email without giving any thought that he was not allowed to do so on a University computer even when the original message came into his email inbox. See 

On August 5, 2016, Dash was inducted into the Hall of Fame of the National Association of Black Journalists (NABJ) along with 43 other founders of the organization.

Three years later, on August 9, 2019, Dash was inducted into the NABJ's Hall of Fame a second time with his colleagues, the six other members of The Washington Post'''s Metro Seven. The Metro Seven was made up of seven Washington Post black reporters who filed a discrimination complaint against The Post'' with the Equal Opportunity Employment Commission (EEOC) on March 23, 1972, the first action of its kind against a major metropolitan American newspaper. Of the original seven, only four were able to attend the event. Including Dash, they are LaBarbara (Bobbi) Bowman, Ivan C. Brandon, Ronald (Ron) Taylor. Richard (Scoop) Prince and Penny Mickelbury were not able to attend. The seventh member, Mike Hodge, died Sept. 9, 2017.

References

External links
 Leon Dash page in The New New Journalism
 The Pulitzer Prizer article - The Rosa Lee Story
 The When Children Want Children Article
 

1944 births
Living people
American male journalists
Howard University alumni
Peace Corps volunteers
Pulitzer Prize for Explanatory Journalism winners
The Washington Post people
American expatriates in Kenya